The Representation of the People Act 1949 was an Act of the Parliament of the United Kingdom. The Act consolidated previous electoral law, but also made some changes to administration. Representation of the People amendments followed in 1969, 1977, 1978, and 1980, all being repealed through consolidation into the Representation of the People Act 1983.

The principal change was to provide for the conduct of future reviews of Parliamentary boundaries by the permanent Parliamentary Boundary Commissions. The Act also abolished the terms 'Parliamentary Borough' and 'Parliamentary County', renaming them 'Borough constituency' and 'County constituency', abolished the university constituencies, and removed a requirement that the City of London form its own constituency. The Boundary Commissions were instructed to review all boundaries within 3–7 years from the Act coming into force, and thereafter to review the boundaries periodically.

In addition the Act made some changes to the franchise, removing the remaining provisions allowing plural voting in parliamentary elections by people who owned business premises. (However, plural voting for local government elections continued until it was abolished, outside the City of London, by the Representation of the People Act 1969. It still exists in the City of London – see City of London Corporation elections). From this point forward, there was a single electoral register for both local government and Parliamentary elections and each voter was only allowed to vote once in any general election even if they happened to be registered in more than one address for local elections.

See also 

 Reform Acts
 Representation of the People Act

References

 D. J. Rossiter, Ronald John Johnston, C. J. Pattie, "The Boundary Commissions: redrawing the UK's map of parliamentary constituencies", Manchester University Press, 1999, p. 87–90.

Representation of the People Acts
United Kingdom Acts of Parliament 1949
November 1949 events in the United Kingdom